Elections to South Hams District Council took place on 7 May, the same day as other United Kingdom local elections and the General Election. 19 of the 20 wards were up for election, each with either 1, 2 or 3 councillors to be elected. The number of seats up for election in each ward is indicated by the number in the brackets following the ward name. This was the first election with new boundary changes taking effect after the number of wards was reduced by ten and councillors by 9. The ward of Salcombe & Thurlestone was uncontested, with Conservative Party candidates Judy Pearce and Simon Wright elected. The Conservative Party increased their share of seats in the council, despite a slight decrease in votes. Meanwhile, the Green Party overtook the Liberal Democrats to become the largest opposition party.

Results summary

Ward elections

Allington & Strete

Bickleigh & Cornwood

Blackawton & Stoke Fleming Ward

Charterlands

Dartington & Staverton

Dartmouth & East Dart (3)

Ermington & Ugborough

Ivybridge East (2)

Ivybridge West (2)

Kingsbridge

Loddiswell & Aveton Gifford

Marldon & Littlehempston

Newton & Yealmpton

South Brent

Stokenham

Totnes (3)

Wembury and Brixton (2)

West Dart

Woolwell

References

2015 English local elections
May 2015 events in the United Kingdom
2015
2010s in Devon